Makgatho Lewanika Mandela (26 June 1950 – 6 January 2005) was the son of Nelson Mandela and his first wife Evelyn Mase. He is the father of Ndaba Mandela. He died of AIDS on 6 January 2005 in Johannesburg.

Circumstances surrounding his death
His second wife Zondi died on 13 July 2003 at age 46. At first, her cause of death was given as pneumonia; after Makgatho's death, his son from his previous marriage Mandla later announced that her pneumonia had been a complication of AIDS.

When Nelson Mandela announced the cause of his son's death, he said: "Let us give publicity to HIV/AIDS and not hide it, because the only way to make it appear like a normal illness like tuberculosis, like cancer, is always to come out and say somebody has died because of HIV/AIDS, and people will stop regarding it as something extraordinary."

Family and legacy

He was married twice. His first wife was Rose Rayne Perry (later known as Nolusapho). His second wife was Zondi. He had four sons: Zwelivelile "Mandla" (1974), Ndaba Mandela (1982), Mbuso Mandela (1991) and Andile Mandela  (1993).  Makgatho Mandela is sometimes wrongly referred to as the older son of Nelson Mandela, but his brother Madiba Thembekile "Thembi" Mandela was born in 1945. Thembi was killed in a car crash in 1969.

Due to Nelson Mandela having renounced his hereditary claim and Thembi's early death, Makgatho rose to become heir apparent to the chieftaincy that had once been held by Henry Mandela, Nelson's father. Upon his own death, his claim passed to his son Mandla, who eventually succeeded to the title.

References

External links
Guardian article on his death
BBC article on his death

1950 births
2005 deaths
20th-century South African lawyers
Makgatho
AIDS-related deaths in South Africa